Mehmet Çoğum (born 5 February 1983) is a Turkish footballer who played as a right back and current football coach. He was most recently the head coach of Dardanelspor.

Çoğum began his professional career with Dardanel Spor A.Ş. Prior to joining MKE Ankaragücü, Çoğum played for Gaziantepspor, Konyaspor, Denizlispor, and Karabükspor.

References

1983 births
Living people
People from İskenderun
Turkish footballers
Turkey under-21 international footballers
Süper Lig players
Dardanelspor footballers
Gaziantepspor footballers
Konyaspor footballers
Denizlispor footballers
Kardemir Karabükspor footballers
MKE Ankaragücü footballers
Turkey youth international footballers
TFF First League players
Association football defenders
Sportspeople from Hatay